Sarah Chelangat (born 5 June 2001) is a Ugandan track and field athlete who specializes in long-distance running. She represented Uganda at the 2019 World Athletics Championships, competing in women's 5000 metres.

She competed at the 2020 Summer Olympics. She had shin and knee injuries that kept her off the track for most of 2021, and she did not do much at the 2021 Tokyo Olympics.

Her performance in the 5000 metres in Nijmegen in June 2019, 15:00.61, is a Ugandan national record.

References

External links

 

Ugandan female middle-distance runners
Ugandan female long-distance runners
2001 births
Living people
World Athletics Championships athletes for Uganda
Athletes (track and field) at the 2019 African Games
Athletes (track and field) at the 2018 Summer Youth Olympics
Athletes (track and field) at the 2018 African Youth Games
Youth Olympic gold medalists for Uganda
Youth Olympic gold medalists in athletics (track and field)
African Games competitors for Uganda
Athletes (track and field) at the 2020 Summer Olympics
Olympic athletes of Uganda
21st-century Ugandan women